Iroquois Motor Car Company (1903–1907) was a manufacturer of automobiles in Syracuse, New York, and later, Seneca Falls, New York.

History 
The company was founded by John S. Leggett as Leggett Carriage Company and originally specialized in the production of automobile bodies.

The Iroquois was a four-cylinder car with sliding gear transmission and shaft drive. Horsepower and size increasing yearly up to a 40hp model in 1907.

Advertisements

See also 
Brass Era car

References 

Veteran vehicles
1900s cars
Motor vehicle manufacturers based in Syracuse, New York
Defunct motor vehicle manufacturers of the United States
Defunct companies based in Syracuse, New York
Vehicle manufacturing companies established in 1903
Vehicle manufacturing companies disestablished in 1907
1903 establishments in New York (state)
1907 disestablishments in New York (state)
Brass Era vehicles
Motor vehicle manufacturers based in New York (state)